Endive is a leaf vegetable belonging to the genus Cichorium, which includes several similar bitter-leafed vegetables. Species include Cichorium endivia (also called endive), Cichorium pumilum (also called wild endive), and Cichorium intybus (also called common chicory). Common chicory includes types such as radicchio, puntarelle, and Belgian endive.

There is considerable confusion between Cichorium endivia and Cichorium intybus.

Cichorium endivia
There are two main varieties of cultivated C. endivia chicon:

 Curly endive, or frisée (var. crispum). This type has narrow, green, curly outer leaves. It is sometimes called chicory in the United States and is called chicorée frisée in French. Further confusion results from the fact that frisée also refers to greens lightly wilted with oil.
 Escarole, or broad-leaved endive (var. latifolia), has broad, pale green leaves and is less bitter than the other varieties. Varieties or names include broad-leaved Batavian endive, grumolo, scarola, and scarole. It is eaten like other greens, sauteed, chopped into soups and stews, or as part of a green salad.

Cichorium intybus

Cichorium intybus endive is popular in Europe, and is also known as leaf chicory.

Chemical constituents
Endive is rich in many vitamins and minerals, especially in folate and vitamins A and K, and is high in fiber. It also contains kaempferol.

References

External links
 
 
 
 

Cichorieae
Leaf vegetables
sv:Frisésallat